"Rush" is a song by Scottish singer-songwriter Lewis Capaldi featuring vocals from Canadian singer and songwriter Jessie Reyez. It was released as a digital download on 23 February 2018 via Virgin Records. The song peaked at number 74 on the Scottish Singles Chart.

Music video
A music video to accompany the release of "Rush" was first released onto YouTube on 8 March 2018 at a total length of four minutes and two seconds.

Track listing

Charts

Release history

Certifications

References

2018 songs
2018 singles
Jessie Reyez songs
Lewis Capaldi songs
Virgin Records singles